The EMD FP45 is a cowl unit type of C-C diesel locomotive produced in the United States by General Motors Electro-Motive Division (EMD).  It was produced beginning in 1967 at the request of the Atchison, Topeka and Santa Fe Railway, which did not want its prestigious Super Chief/El Capitan and other passenger trains pulled by freight style hood unit locomotives, which have external walkways.

History and development
The EMD SDP45 was a good passenger locomotive, but to the Santa Fe Railway it did not look the part. EMD therefore designed a lightweight "cowl" body to cover the locomotive, though it did not, as in earlier cab units, provide any structural strength, which remained in the frame.  The cowl provided sleeker looks, better aerodynamics at speed, and allowed the crew to enter the engine compartment en route for diagnostics and maintenance. Final drive gear ratio for passenger service was 57:20.

Orders
Santa Fe purchased nine of the locomotives (road numbers 100 through 108), and the Milwaukee Road bought five for its passenger service (road numbers 1 through 5). The Milwaukee Road units were delivered without dynamic braking. Reportedly, Illinois Central Railroad was considering an order for five FP45s as well (EMD order #5742, serial #s 34952-34956), but canceled it. Such low production was feasible and profitable for EMD since the locomotive was fundamentally just a re-clothed SDP45.  Power, as in the SDP45, was from a V20 645E3 engine (or prime mover) developing .

Derivatives

A freight-only derivative, the EMD F45, was sold in greater numbers (86) to Santa Fe, the Great Northern Railway, and the Burlington Northern Railroad. Amtrak bought a similar passenger locomotive based on the  SD40-2, the SDP40F. 

The last three F45's in service were on the Montana Rail Link and the New York, Susquehanna and Western Railway in the northern and northeastern United States. These units were taken out of service in 2006 for the MRL and 2010 for the NYSW. Two are known to survive, with one located at the Izaak Walton Inn, now converted into a lodge.

Rebuilds
Between April 1980 and December 1982, Santa Fe's San Bernardino shops rebuilt eight FP45s 5940-5943, 5945-5948. They emerged as 5990-5993, 5995-5998, and were redesignated SDFP45s. The 5944 was retired in September 1981 on account of a wreck at Toland, Texas. Electrically they were upgraded to SD45-2 standards. Mechanically, they were re-geared from 59:18 to 60:17, reducing their top speed from 89 to 83 mph (143 to 134 km/h).

In the mid 1980s Santa Fe again re-geared them - this time to 62:15 for 71 mph (114 km/h).

Withdrawal
Milwaukee Road's FP45s were all sold for scrap in 1981 and 1984. Santa Fe SDFP45 No. 5944 was wrecked in 1981, Santa Fe SDFP45 No. 96 was wrecked in 1994 on Cajon Pass. While No. 91 was sold to the Wisconsin Central in January 1995, becoming their #6652 and the rest stayed in service right up until the BN/SF merger in 1996, and were retired shortly after the merger.

Preservation 
Those that were not wrecked in service, or sold to other railroads, are on display in museums:
 Santa Fe 90: was donated to the Oklahoma Railway Museum in Oklahoma City in a non-operational state. #90 was the last FP45 donated by the Santa Fe and had resided on a RIP track for two years before being delivered to the museum.
 Santa Fe 92: was donated to the Illinois Railway Museum in Union, Illinois. In 2010, volunteers restored 92's control stand so that it could control other locomotives via MU. The locomotive was moved to National Railway Equipment in Silvis, IL during July 2017, where a replacement 20-645E3 engine, AR10 alternator, and a WBO air compressor (all purchased by the museum) were installed. This made the locomotive fully operational for the first time since at least 1997.
 Santa Fe 93: preserved at the Great Plains Transportation Museum in Wichita, Kansas.
 Santa Fe 95: preserved at the Western America Railroad Museum in Barstow, California.
 Santa Fe 97: preserved at the Museum of the American Railroad in Frisco, Texas.
 Santa Fe 108: was donated in operating condition minus the cab's air conditioner to the Southern California Railway Museum at Perris, California.  This locomotive has the distinction of being the last passenger locomotive ever purchased by Santa Fe.  Its restoration was completed in October, 2018 and it is now in operating condition for the first time since 2012.

See also
EMD SDP40F

References

External links

 Additional photos, specifications and information on the surviving FP45 locomotives-by Jim Fuhrman
Santa Fe 92 at IRM as preserved at IRM
 Preservation project for Santa Fe FP-45 93 At the Great Plains Transportation Museum.

F45P
C-C locomotives
Passenger locomotives
Diesel-electric locomotives of the United States
Railway locomotives introduced in 1967
Standard gauge locomotives of the United States